The main titles of the Street Fighter fighting game series have introduced a varied cast of 80 World Warriors from the main series, and 34 from several spin-offs, for a total of 114 playable characters who originated from different countries around the world, each with his or her unique fighting style. This is a list of playable characters and non-playable opponents from the whole franchise. They are categorized based on the game in which they first became playable, including the original Street Fighter game, the Street Fighter II series, the Street Fighter Alpha series, the Street Fighter III series, the Street Fighter IV series, Street Fighter V, Street Fighter 6 and other related games.

Main series

The table below summarizes every single fighter in the series. A green cell indicates that the character is playable, with the number indicating the revision of the game they are introduced in (e.g. the number in SFV indicates the downloadable content season), a red cell indicates that the character is not playable (they do not appear in the game), while a yellow cell indicates that the character makes a non-playable appearance. Bold indicates that the character made their debut in the series.

Notes

EX series

Notes

The Movie games

Introduced in Street Fighter

Adon

 appears in the original Street Fighter as a Muay Thai warrior that the player faces before the final match against Sagat. He also appears in Alpha, Alpha 2 and Alpha 3. In the first three Alpha games, Adon is characterized as a former pupil of Sagat, seeking to surpass his disgraced master by defeating him, in which he succeeds. In Alpha 3, he tries to track down and challenge Akuma. He briefly appears in Sagat's Street Fighter IV prologue, where he is defeated by Sagat. Adon is a playable character in Super Street Fighter IV, where decides to join the S.I.N tournament and gets his rematch with Sagat, defeating him there. In his ending, he makes fun from redundant Sagat and since then he considers himself as a new Muay Thai master. Like Birdie and Eagle, Adon and Sagat share a motif: both characters' special moves are inspired by big cats, the jaguar and the tiger.

Adon appears in one episode of the Street Fighter cartoon series as a non-speaking role. He also makes a brief cameo in Street Fighter Alpha: The Animation.

He was the only character fully created by Keiji Inafune for the original Street Fighter. Adon was included in a wishlist of characters by GamesRadar for inclusion in Street Fighter X Tekken. Adon is ranked 22nd in a worldwide Street Fighter character poll held between 2017 and 2018.

Birdie

Birdie debuted in the first Street Fighter as the first of two opponents the player faces in England, where he is initially presented as a tall, white punk rocker with a beak-shaped mohawk hairstyle. He is later redesigned from the Street Fighter Alpha series onwards as a hulking Black British punk rocker with a blonde, blade-shaped mohawk. After a long absence from the series, Birdie returns as a playable character for Street Fighter V, where he is presented as abdominally obese and has new special moves that involve eating and throwing food at his opponents.

Birdie appears in two episodes of the Street Fighter cartoon series. He also makes an appearance in Street Fighter Alpha: The Animation as one of several fighters accompanying Ryu to rescue Shun from Dr. Sadler. Birdie also appears in the Street Fighter Alpha manga by Masahiko Nakahira. He hires Ryu, whom he befriended after a past fight, as a bodyguard for his drug smuggling operation.

Birdie's appearance in the first Street Fighter was voted joint last in Capcom's own popularity poll of 85 characters for the 15th anniversary of Street Fighter, along with a low placement at 87th in a worldwide Street Fighter character poll held between 2017 and 2018. Street Fighter Alphas Birdie also topped Gameists's list of the 10 "lamest Street Fighter characters ever conceived". Nevertheless, he is included in a series of character wishlists prior to his return to the series in Street Fighter V by IGN, Askmen.com and GamesRadar.

Eagle

 is a bouncer from England and a master of stick fighting derived from the combination of Eskrima and Singlestick. He craves to experience all fighting arts, searching for the perfect duel. He is introduced in the first Street Fighter as the second computer-controlled opponent the players face in England. Upon his reappearance in later titles, Eagle was redesigned and inspired by Queen lead singer Freddie Mercury: One of his voiced win quotes is "the show must go on", based on the song of the same name. He appears as a selectable character in the crossover game Capcom vs. SNK 2, having become a secret agent for MI6. He has special moves named after Canterbury, Liverpool, Manchester, Oxford and St. Andrews.

European Street Fighter champion Ryan Hart listed Eagle at the top of his list of best Street Fighter characters. Eagle was included in the UGO.com top 50 Street Fighter characters. Eagle was nominated eighth by Heavy.com as one of 10 characters they wanted to see in Ultra Street Fighter IV.

Geki
 is a Japanese Ninja who fights with hand claws and shuriken and has the ability to teleport. He is the second Japanese opponent in the original Street Fighter, a battle which takes place near Mount Fuji. In an issue of UDON's Street Fighter comic book, Geki appears as an assassin sent to kill Gen. In the Street Fighter Legends: Ibuki comic miniseries, Geki is depicted as a rival clan to Ibuki's clan. On the official website for Street Fighter V, it is implied that the original was killed and had a successor named Geki II. He makes a cameo in Vega's Street Fighter V ending.

Gen

Portrayed by: Robin Shou (The Legend of Chun-Li)
 is an elderly Chinese martial arts master and former assassin with ties to Chun-Li's backstory, first introduced as a non-playable opponent in the original Street Fighter. Gen resurfaces as a playable character in Street Fighter Alpha 2, Street Fighter Alpha 3, as well as Street Fighter IV and its updates. Gen's fighting style incorporates various kung fu styles that he has utilized in his assassinations. As of Street Fighter Alpha 2, this is reflected in Gen's ability to switch between two fighting styles during gameplay (mantis and crane). Gen also makes minor appearances in Street Fighter V and Super Gem Fighter: Mini Mix.

Gen has appeared in media outside of video games. UDON's comic book adaptation delves into some of Gen's history as well as giving him a fairly pivotal role in the second arc of the series. Gen appears as one of the main characters the live-action movie, Street Fighter: The Legend of Chun-Li, portrayed by Robin Shou. Depicted as a younger martial arts master, he serves as the leader of a secret anti-crime organization known as the Order of the Web who taught Chun-Li her more advanced moves, including the Kikoken, and accompanies her in the fight against M. Bison and Shadaloo. He was mentioned by Gouken in the second episode Street Fighter: Assassin's Fist.

Gen has been positively received for his in-universe longevity, and for being one of the few characters in fighting games who has multiple movesets and who is challenging for most players to master. IGN ranked Gen at number eighteen in their "Top 25 Street Fighter Characters" article. He was ranked 20th on the list of top Street Fighter characters by UGO.com. Complex ranked Gen as the "21st best Street Fighter character"." Now Gamer listed Gen and Heihachi Mishima as one of the rivalries they want to see in Street Fighter X Tekken. In a GamesRadar article by Michael Grimm, a fight between Gen and Wang Jinrei was written as one of the ones players wanted to see in Street Fighter X Tekken. In 2015, Gamer Headlines ranked Gen as the "9th top over 50 video game character in gaming". In 2016, Screen Rant named Gen the "8th Most Powerful Street Fighter Character". In their rankings of Street Fighter characters, Paste Magazine placed Gen at 41st place. Den of Geek ranked Gen as the "34th Best Street Fighter Character".

Joe
, who appears as the first American opponent in the original Street Fighter, is an underground kickboxing champion who practices by participating in street fights. Similarities between Joe and "Ghost", the blond underground fighter in red jeans from the Capcom game Final Fight: Streetwise, have led many to believe they are the same character.

Ken

Lee
 is a Chinese martial arts expert seeking to test his skills against worthy opponents. He is the first Chinese opponent in the original Street Fighter, encountered at the Great Wall of China. He later appears in the manga Street Fighter: Sakura Ganbaru! as an opponent who challenges Sakura in a street fighting event sponsored by Karin Kanzuki at the Setagaya Ward. He appears in UDON's Street Fighter Legends: Chun-Li to challenge Fei Long for the honor of revealing a Chinese artifact. Lee is revealed to be an undisclosed relative of the Street Fighter III characters Yun and Yang.

Mike
 is an African-American boxer who formerly competed professionally, until he accidentally killed an opponent during a match. He is the second opponent the player faces in the US in the original Street Fighter. He is thought to be a precursor to Balrog (known as M. Bison in Japan) from Street Fighter II due to his similar profile and outer appearance. The Street Fighter: World Warrior Encyclopedia notably lists them as separate individuals  as does the Japanese Street Fighter V website, which has a separate character page for Mike with redesigned artwork for him. He makes a cameo appearance Street Fighter V Arcade Edition.

Retsu
 is a former Shorinji Kempo instructor who was expelled from his temple after getting involved in too many fights. He is the first opponent the player faces in Japan in the original Street Fighter. Although Retsu has never appeared in another Street Fighter game, his character has been depicted in later Street Fighter related media, including two Japanese Street Fighter II audio drama albums, an appearance in the US Street Fighter comic book and as a card in Card Fighters 2.

Ryu

Sagat

Introduced in the Street Fighter II series

Akuma

Balrog

Blanka

Cammy

Chun-Li

Dee Jay

Dhalsim

E. Honda

Fei Long

Guile

M. Bison

T. Hawk

Vega

Violent Ken

Zangief

Introduced in the Street Fighter Alpha series
The Street Fighter Alpha series consists of three games: Street Fighter Alpha: Warriors' Dreams (1995), Street Fighter Alpha 2 (1996) and Street Fighter Alpha 3 (1998). The series as a whole serves as a prequel to the Street Fighter II series. In addition to characters from the original Street Fighter and Street Fighter II, the Alpha series also features appearances of characters from various other sources, such as Final Fight (Cody, Guy, Sodom, Rolento and Maki), the official Street Fighter manga (Karin and Evil Ryu/Kage) and Capcom Fighting Jam (Ingrid), as well as a few original characters.

Cody

Dan

Evil Ryu

Guy

Ingrid

 was slated to appear in the canceled Capcom Fighting All-Stars arcade game using the nickname "Eternal Goddess", but her animations were completely redrawn in 2D, and she was introduced as a playable character in Capcom Fighting Jam for the arcades, Xbox and PlayStation 2. She entered the Street Fighter universe in Street Fighter Alpha 3 MAX for the PSP. Little is known about her, although Alpha 3 MAX presents some possibilities about her true origins. Her source of power is apparently derived from Psycho Power, yet is not purely evil like that of M. Bison; though seemingly quite similar to Rose's Soul Power. Ingrid claims that she is the true bearer of what is called "Psycho Power", telling M. Bison that the Psycho Power is "her power" and that he has stolen it. Her power is so intense that if given the chance, she can actually break Ryu's madness if he ever succumbs to the Satsui no Hado. How M. Bison came into possession of the item is never explained, though it bears a resemblance to the crests on her head. When M. Bison is eventually defeated, she comments that a regular human being like him couldn't possibly control such power and takes the whole Psycho Drive with her as she leaves. Ingrid also possesses psychic abilities similar to Rose's. She addresses both Ryu and Rose by name, despite the two of them never revealing their names to her. Rose also cannot look into Ingrid's future, as she did with other Street Fighters. Ingrid's arcade ending reveals that she has the power of time travel, sending herself to the year 201X where she notices that Ryu "is up to something interesting". Ingrid's Street Fighter V character profile disregards her story from Street Fighter Alpha 3 MAX, amending her backstory to be more in line with how she was originally going to be portrayed in Capcom Fighting All-Stars. Ingrid also plays a role in the background story of Street Fighter X Tekken. She appears as a solo unit in Project X Zone 2. In addition, her likeness is featured as a downloadable alternate costume for Karin in Street Fighter V.

On Capcom's official Street Fighter Character Poll, Ingrid ranked 4th most popular character in the Japanese rankings. In another official poll conducted by Bandai Namco, Ingrid was the third most requested Street Fighter character to be added to the roster of Tekken X Street Fighter, having received 15.38% of the votes. Ingrid also placed tenth by Heavy.com as one of 10 Characters they wanted to see in Ultra Street Fighter IV. In a 2014 poll ran by Japanese gaming magazine Famitsu, Ingrid was ranked as one of the top three most requested characters to be added to Ultra Street Fighter IV.

Juli and Juni

 and  make their first appearance in the arcade version of Street Fighter Alpha 3 as a pair of sub-bosses. Before the final battle against M. Bison in the single-player mode, the player faces them simultaneously in a two-on-one fight similar to the Dramatic Battle match. The two characters can be unlocked in the arcade version, but they have no storyline in the actual game, sharing their ending with M. Bison. They are similar to Cammy in character design, but have their own special moves and super combos. Juli and Juni are the only characters in Alpha 3 to have combined special moves and super combos; these are used exclusively when both characters fight as a pair during the Dramatic Battle mode. The twelve members of the Dolls are named after the months of the Gregorian calendar in various languages, Juli and Juni being German for July and June.All About Capcom Head-to-Head Fighting Game 1987–2000, page 338 Juli and Juni were given their own individual storyline and ending when they became part of the regular character roster in the console versions of Alpha 3, in which Juli is assigned to track down Cammy and Juni to track down Ryu. Juli's backstory is further developed in the console versions of Alpha 3 with the addition of T. Hawk to the cast. In T. Hawk's single-player storyline, Juli is revealed to be Julia, his girlfriend who used to live in his home village until she was kidnapped and brainwashed by Shadaloo. Juli and Juni appear in Namco × Capcom as two enemy characters that protagonists face throughout the game. They make cameo appearances in SNK vs. Capcom: SVC Chaos and in Super Street Fighter IV.

Karin

Maki

Nash

R. Mika

Rolento

Rose

Sakura

Santamu
Santamu (ሳንታም) is one of the Shadaloo Dolls shown at the end of Street Fighter Alpha 3'''s Arcade Mode, making an in-game appearance in the story mode of Street Fighter V. From Ethiopia, she specialises in spear combat and espionage. She is named after the month of August, and is accompanied by a golden lion tamarin named Kiki (ኪኪ).

Shin Akuma

Sodom

Introduced in the Street Fighter III series
Alex

Alex is a wrestler from New York who first appears in Street Fighter III: New Generation, and his design and character are based on an extremely young Hulk Hogan.   He serves as a protagonist of Street Fighter III.  His parents died at a young age, so he was raised by his father's friend, Tom, who trained him in fighting. In New Generation, Tom loses a fight with Gill, the president of the Illuminati and gets injured as a result. This angered Alex and prompted him to enter the third World Warrior tournament hosted by Gill in order kill him. Alex beats Gill and wins the tournament, but spares Gill, who is impressed about Alex's skills after their encounter. Alex eventually returns to Tom as a changed person after fighting various people around the world.All About Capcom Head-to-Head Fighting Game 1987–2000, page 299 Street Fighter III: 2nd Impact retcons New Generation, but Alex's story stays the same, but he now has a rivalry with Hugo, a German pro wrestler of extreme height. Alex returns in Street Fighter III: 3rd Strike with a slightly different personality. He meets Ryu and fought him, only to lose, in which Ryu told Alex to explore the world and find worthy fighters.

Alex makes an appearance in Tatsunoko vs. Capcom: Ultimate All-Stars as a playable character, alongside other Street Fighter characters, Ryu and Chun-Li. He also appears in Capcom Fighting All-Stars and Capcom Fighting Evolution.Ashcraft, Brian (2008-07-01). Two New Tatsunoko vs. Capcom Characters Revealed!. Kotaku. Retrieved on 2008-07-03 Alex reappears as a playable character in Street Fighter V as the first of 6 characters to be released after the game's launch in 2016. In the story mode of Street Fighter V, "A Shadow Falls", Alex is first shown winning a pro-wrestling tournament. He then competes in a tag-team exhibition match with Laura against Zangief and R. Mika, which is broadcast live on television. However the signal cuts out due to a Black Moon detonating over New York City, causing a blackout. Dhalsim comes to his trailer, wanting the chess piece, but Alex believes Dhalsim is a mugger and fights him. Dhalsim successfully convinces Alex otherwise and receives the chess piece from Alex. Dhalsim then tells Alex that big things will happen to him in the future, foreshadowing his role as the main character of the Street Fighter III series, and teleports away.

In December 1997, Alex ranked 44th on Gamest's "Top 50" video game characters, tying with Goro Daimon, and in January 1998 was named the 22nd-best character of the preceding year, tying with Ryuji Yamazaki.  IGN voted Alex one of their top 25 fighters. He was ranked as the sixth-best Street Fighter character by UGO.com. Alex was named by Heavy.com as the character they wanted to see the most in Ultra Street Fighter IV. Alex was also named as 10th-best character in the series by Complex. In the official poll by Bandai Namco, Alex was the second most requested Street Fighter side character to be added to the roster of Tekken X Street Fighter, as of August 2012 racking up 17.97% of votes.

Dudley

Elena

Gill

 is the main antagonist and final boss of the Street Fighter III series. At the start of the series he is the President of the Illuminati, a secret society that has controlled the underworld for thousands of years and seeks to turn the whole world into a utopia by causing an armageddon. His ultimate goal is to test the skills of several warriors and coerce them into his cause. Gill appears in his default costume as a tall, muscular man with flowing blond hair, the right side of his body colored red, and the left side colored blue, wearing nothing but a loincloth. 2nd Impact introduces Gill's younger brother Urien as a player character of similar build and attire but with short hair; in addition, Urien's body is the same color on both sides. In Urien's ending, Gill is revealed to have been promoted to  after Urien takes over Gill's former presidency, which he still holds by the time of 3rd Strike The blond woman who assists Gill before battle in 3rd Strike is his secretary , who also appears in Dudley's ending in the first two games, handing him the keys to Dudley's car. Gill is not playable in any of the arcade versions of the Street Fighter III games. However, he is selectable once he is unlocked from within the console versions of 2nd Impact and 3rd Strike. He appears in the ending of Street Fighter V revealing that Helen is in fact his secretary Kolin. Gill makes his playable debut in Street Fighter V as a playable character in the Champion Edition update.

Hugo

 is a massive professional wrestler from Germany who first appears in Final Fight under the name . He made his first Street Fighter appearance in Street Fighter III: 2nd Impact, in which he wears a similar pink leopard-print shirt and pants with chains around his waist. Because of his physical appearance and strength, Hugo is often compared to André the Giant, a real-life wrestler who worked for the WWF in the mid-80's and inspired the Andore character, extending as far as Hugo's rivalry with Alex, mirroring that between André and Hulk Hogan. Hugo is the son of a farmer from the German countryside and was raised alongside his two younger sisters. After leaving his hometown at the age of 20, he becomes a popular wrestler in the US, with former street warrior Poison, another enemy character from Final Fight, as his manager.Capcom. p. 18. Street Fighter III: Double Impact, instruction manual. Retrieved 3 July 2008 In 2nd Impact, Hugo seeks a partner for an upcoming tag team wrestling tournament due to take place in a few months. Hugo's final opponent in the single-player mode varies, the four possibilities being Gill, Ryu, Elena and Necro. Afterwards, Hugo and his rival go on to form a tag team to compete in the CWA tag tournament. In 3rd Strike, Hugo achieves such an overwhelming victory in the tag tournament that no other wrestler dares to challenge him anymore. Worried about the lack of matches for Hugo, Poison forms a new wrestling organization with him, recruiting only the best fighters. In Hugo's ending, he and Poison form the Huge Wrestling Army (H.W.A.), which includes other 3rd Strike characters.All About Capcom Head-to-Head Fighting Game 1987–2000, page 335 Outside the Street Fighter III series, Hugo appears as a playable character in SNK vs. Capcom: SVC Chaos and Capcom USA's Final Fight Revenge. He also appears as a playable character in Street Fighter X Tekken with his official tag partner, Poison. He is an optional pit-fight opponent in Final Fight Streetwise. He also appears as a playable character in Ultra Street Fighter IV.

Ibuki

Makoto

Necro

He is the third of four children, with two older brothers and a younger sister. He also has massive data. After the collapse of the Soviet Union, he wanders off from his home village and into the vicinity of Moscow, where he comes into contact with Gill's organization, which remodels his DNA to turn him into a living weapon, granting him superhuman flexibility. His fighting style is simulated by a computer, then programmed into his brain with cyber implants.Capcom. p. 17. Street Fighter III: Double Impact, instruction manual. Retrieved 3 July 2008 Necro has a long reach and can use throws and electrocution. In his ending, he is tricked by Gill and left for dead in a facility, until he is rescued by a young girl named , and the pair go on a journey together. Necro's story is the same in 2nd Impact, in which he gains the nickname "super electromagnetic alien". In this game, however, he also has a role as one of Hugo's potential final bosses and tag partners, forming the tag team "Thunderbolt". In 3rd Strike, Necro and Effie are pursued by agents of the organization, but still live in hope of "truth and liberty". In his ending, Necro saves Effie from falling and thwarts agents of the Illuminati at the Siberian railroad.All About Capcom Head-to-Head Fighting Game 1987–2000, page 331

Oro

Q

Q, who first appears in Street Fighter III: 3rd Strike, is a mysterious individual in a trenchcoat and hat, whose face is concealed by an expressionless metal mask, based on the main character from Tokusatsu series Robot Detective (Robot Keiji K). Q is being tracked by the CIA because of his presence in numerous strange disasters.All About Capcom Head-to-Head Fighting Game 1987–2000, page 308 Nothing of his background has yet been revealed. All of Q's techniques are named in "descriptive" form rather than with traditionally-styled move names, as if they are given by people who have watched him fight. Q was nominated third by Heavy.com as one of 10 Characters they wanted to see in Ultra Street Fighter IV.

Remy

, who first appears in Street Fighter III: 3rd Strike, is a young turquoise-haired savateur from Paris who seeks revenge against his father, a martial artist who abandoned him and his sister. After Remy's sister died, he encased her body in an iced casket, which he keeps in an underwater cove in the Bay of Biscay. Remy takes his aggression out on other martial artists by challenging them to battle. Remy's rival match illustrates this, as his sudden appearance and challenge surprise Alex, who thinks him nothing but a troubled man. In his ending, Remy realizes that he has been inadvertently following in his father's footsteps. He makes peace with his sister and follows a new path. His attacks are similar to that of Guile and Charlie, but no notable connection to them has been established. Remy was voted 8th in Capcom's popularity poll of 85 characters for the 15th anniversary of Street Fighter.

Sean

 is a young boy from an average home in Brazil and the younger brother of Laura. Impressed by Ken's performance at a martial arts rally, Sean seeks to become his disciple, calling him "Master Ken". An intense but courteous young man, Sean is determined to win no matter what. He was once trained by his grandfather, who was of Japanese descent. Sean's greatest weakness is receiving attacks while attacking. He dreams of creating his original special moves.Capcom. p. 15. Street Fighter III: Double Impact, instruction manual. Retrieved 3 July 2008 It is Sean who leads the basketball parry bonus round in 3rd Strike. In his ending, he becomes Ken's disciple, only to be told that he needs to defeat Ryu to become worthy. In 3rd Strike, Sean is allowed to participate in a martial arts tournament, but Ken tells him that his current skills will not even get him through the preliminaries and that he needs to develop his own style. In his 3rd Strike ending, Sean dreams that he has won the championship title, but in fact he loses in the qualifying rounds as a result of his lack of training. Sean makes a cameo appearance in Ryu's ending and intro in Marvel vs. Capcom, and as a supporting character in Street Fighter V.

Twelve

 is a humanoid creature introduced as a playable character in Street Fighter III: 3rd Strike. His stage background, shared with Necro, is Saint Basil's Cathedral. Twelve is the ultimate humanoid weapon developed by Gill's organization. He has a shapeshifting body that is an improved and strengthened version of the prototype body given to Necro. Via the X.C.O.P.Y. super art, Twelve has the ability to briefly copy his opponent's form and moves. His targets are filled with despair when he corners them. His objective is to track down Necro and Effie, who are fleeing from the organization. Twelve is considered a low tier character due to his low damage output and health.

Urien

Yun and Yang

Introduced in the Street Fighter IV series

Abel

 is a heavily scarred French martial artist described as an amnesiac.   He serves as a protagonist of Street Fighter IV. Obsessively following every lead on the whereabouts of Shadaloo's remnants, he was found in the burning remains of a Shadaloo base and nursed back to health by a group of mercenaries, working alongside them to rediscover his past and to defeat Shadaloo once and for all. He recognizes Guile's "Sonic Boom" technique, but refuses to comment when Guile presses him for information about Charlie, its originator. It is hinted in his original ending that Abel may have been abducted in his youth to serve as a "replacement body" for M.Bison, or created by Shadaloo as a prototype of Seth, a later replacement body. This is reinforced by dialogue from both Bison and Seth, who refer to him as "the one that got away". The appearance of his eyes change to resemble Seth's during the initiation of his Ultra Combo 1, Soulless. It is also hinted that Charlie was the person that helped him as Abel recognizes Guile's fighting style and Abel even comments to Chun-Li about the soldier that rescued him from Shadaloo. In Abel's rival encounter, Abel mentions that he recognizes Guile's Sonic Boom, leading to speculation that he may have spent time with Charlie. Abel's fighting style has elements from Judo, Kyokushin style of karate, Wrestling, Sambo and Mixed martial arts. He obsesses big judo or wrestling type of throws and slams as well his signature move Flying wheel kick (Jap. kaiten geri) which is originally a full contact karate technique. He usually wears sambo like composition; blue judogi or sambo kurtka with white shorts and belt and also pair of shin pads and MMA gloves. In Street Fighter IV his alternate outfit is like the original, only with blue wrestling singlets with embroidered French flag on his chest.

Abel appears as a playable character in the crossover fighting game Street Fighter X Tekken, with his official tag partner, Guile. In the original design, he was a young judo fighter who wore pigtails and "could be mistaken for a girl". He appears as part of Street Fighter Vs story, going undercover within Shadaloo at Guile's request to find out the truth behind Operation C.H.A.I.N.S.

C. Viper

Crimson Viper is an American double agent, who is posing as an employee of the S.I.N. organization. She is in fact an undercover CIA agent, whose goal is to acquire data for the BLECE Project. She wears a S.I.N form-fitting suit which enables her to perform electrical, seismic, and pyrotechnic moves. Her fighting style greatly revolves around baiting, fakes, high jump cancels, and rushdown. She is often seen speaking to her daughter Lauren on her mobile phone. In Street Fighter V, Viper appears in M. Bison's story mode and serves as the main narrator of events while spying on the dictator. Crimson Viper also appears as a playable character in the crossover fighting games Marvel vs. Capcom 3: Fate of Two Worlds and Ultimate Marvel vs. Capcom 3. She is also a boss character in Street Fighter X Mega Man.

Designed by Daigo Ikeno, Viper was designed around the concept of a 20-year-old single mother. Viper was designed based upon marketing research on what sorts of characters an American audience would enjoy playing. She was tailored towards Western tastes, as an experiment to see how audiences would receive the character. Street Fighter IV executive producer Yoshinori Ono has described her as the most "unorthodox" of the four new characters introduced in the title, emphasizing this aspect as one he felt would appeal to American players. She was reportedly his favorite character when the game was early in development. In response to claims that the character resembled one found more commonly in SNK developed games, Ono retorted that the resemblance was unintended, and that she was created from the best parts of several proposed designs during early development. He went on to state that she was also an attempt to create a character with a "cool" design, which he feels are predominant in SNK titles.

Writing for VideoGamer.com, Wesley Yin-Poole described Crimson Viper as looking "ridiculous", and called her a "SNK character lost in a Capcom game". Simon Parkin from Eurogamer felt that the contrast did not quite fit with the game's aesthetic. Todd Ciolek from Anime News Network felt the character fit comfortably in the "Street Fighter mold", in spite of her design's deliberate similarity to characters from the King of Fighters series. A reviewer for the New Straits Times described her as the best of the new characters, praising both her appearance and attack arsenal. GamesRadar stated that while her fighting style made her feel out of place in the series, "that's why she adds so much to the game". IGN AU praised the character, stating approval for the variations of her attacks. AJ Glasser from Kotaku listed her as one of the worst mothers in video games, placing as the worst one from fighting games. UGO Networks ranked C. Viper at #21 on their list of "Fighting Games' Finest Female Fighters", commenting on how she shoves her tie between her breasts and her bright red bouffant. The Guardian ranked her as the 20th top Street Fighter character in 2010, with writer Ryan Hart highlighting her technical combos. C. Viper is ranked 22nd in a worldwide Street Fighter character poll held between 2017 and 2018.

Decapre

Portrayed by: Katrina Durden
 is a character who makes her first playable appearance in Ultra Street Fighter IV. She first appears as a non-player character in Street Fighter Alpha 3, making a cameo in Juli and Juni's introduction. In Ultra Street Fighter IV, it is revealed that she is an earlier, imperfect product of Shadaloo's cloning experiments that would eventually result in Cammy's creation. Years later, during the S.I.N. fighting tournament, she escapes the Shadaloo testing facility that houses her and goes on a murderous rampage. The twelve members of the Dolls are named after the months of the Gregorian calendar in various languages, "Decapre" alluding to the Russian word for December, which is actually "Dekabr" (Декабрь). She bears a strong resemblance to Cammy (even without her mask), though she speaks with a heavy Russian accent and wears a metallic mask to conceal a large scar covering most of her face. Katrina Durden portrays Decapre in the miniseries Street Fighter: Resurrection.

El Fuerte

, meaning "The Strong One" in Spanish, is a masked Mexican luchador. He is an aspiring chef who seeks out the greatest fighters to learn what they eat and incorporate their recipes into his cooking. Despite his love of cooking, he seems to be an incompetent chef. Many of his moves have names referring to Mexican food. The UDON comic series of Street Fighter shows El Fuerte as a big fan of R. Mika. He immediately recognizes fellow wrestler Zangief as "Tornado Rojo" (Red Twister), and then announces his own title as "The Hurricane of the Gulf of Mexico". He has a friendly rivalry with T. Hawk, who bested him before the events of Super Street Fighter IV and told him to challenge him again when he got stronger. The character of El Fuerte is inspired by real wrestlers from Mexico, in particular El Santo, a prominent Mexican wrestler who also wore a silver mask. He makes a cameo appearance in Street Fighter X Tekken.

Gouken

Hakan

 is an oil wrestler from Turkey and is the second new addition to Super Street Fighter IV. His fighting style is based on Yağlı güreş and involves him coating himself in oil to make his body slippery. This enables him to slide across the ground and launch his opponents by squeezing them through his bulging muscles. Hakan is the father of seven young children and the president of a company that seeks to create the perfect olive oil. He is apparently old friends with E. Honda, his fighting rival in Super Street Fighter IV.

Juri

Oni

Poison

Rufus

Seth

Introduced in Street Fighter V
Abigail

 is a character who makes his playable debut in Street Fighter V Season 2 DLC. He is a hot-temperered Canadian member of Metro City's Mad Gear gang who originally appeared as a boss character in 1989's Final Fight. Seeking to clean up his act and try his best to control his temperament, he starts up a legitimate scrap metal business in Metro City, aided by fellow former Mad Gear members Roxy, Axl and J. He is the game's largest character, towering over other heavyweights such as Zangief and Birdie. He has a move called the Ontario drop, and likes to mimic car sounds. Despite fighting out of Metro City, he is noted for being the first playable character in the series who is a Canadian national. Streamline Studios, based in Malaysia, was responsible for modeling and rigging of his model.

Akira

 is a character who makes her playable debut in Street Fighter V Season 5 DLC. She was first introduced in 1997's Rival Schools: United by Fate as a high school student from Seijyun High who initially posed as a male biker to go undercover at Gedo High and find her missing brother Daigo, then investigate the suspicions behind Daigo’s personality change during its sequel Project Justice. In Street Fighter V, Akira is invited by Karin to join her, Sakura and Ibuki for a tea party at her mansion, where she retells the story of how she and Sakura first met during the events of Rival Schools. Her fighting style is derived from Bajiquan, a Chinese martial art that utilizes elbow and shoulder strikes, while Daigo assists her in certain attacks. While the Rival Schools series has long been established as taking place in the same world as the Street Fighter series, Akira is the first Rival Schools character to appear as a playable character in a mainline Street Fighter game.

Ed

 is a character who made his playable debut in Street Fighter V Season 2 DLC. He first appears in a non-playable capacity in Street Fighter IV during Balrog's ending, created as a potential replacement body for Bison before being stolen by S.I.N. He is found as a child and freed by Balrog, who believes Ed's ability to channel Psycho Power like Bison could be useful. He is featured in Street Fighter V: A Shadow Falls, having undergone accelerated aging and working alongside Balrog for Shadaloo. He later joins the playable roster during the game's second season of DLC content, now a grown adult and leader of Neo Shadaloo, an organization seeking to help others who were victims of Shadaloo's experiments. Due to his struggling to fight off the fragment of Bison's soul in him, Ed parts away from Balrog, in order to save themselves, and being forced to fight him one last time before both departing for new lives. Despite parting ways, Ed and Balrog still share a bond with each other, as shown in his Arcade ending artwork where they have an official boxing match. His gameplay can be considered a mixture between Balrog and M.Bison, as he has the boxing (particularly kickboxing outside fist-only official match) prowess of the former and psychokinetic powers of the latter.

Eleven
 is a character who made his playable debut in Street Fighter V Season 5 DLC. He is a humanoid weapon created by Gill's organization, and a prototype of Twelve from Street Fighter III. Though capable of imitating other fighters, Eleven is heavily damaged during a training exercise with Urien and deemed a failure, resulting in the design being further modified to create Twelve. Despite being considered a failure, Eleven's raw material was later used by Kolin for the reconstruction of Charlie Nash. Eleven does not have his own fighting style, but instead functions as a mimic character, transforming into a random fighter with a randomly-selected V-Skill and V-Trigger at the start of each match.

F.A.N.G.

Falke

 is a character introduced in Street Fighter V Season 3 DLC, stated to be of German descent. Falke was built by Shadaloo to be an alternative clone for M. Bison and forced to undergo relentless experimentation and training. After being rescued by Ed, the duo became founding members of Neo Shadaloo. Due to the experiments performed on her, she can channel Psycho Power through her staff "Harmony".

G

G is a character introduced in Street Fighter V Season 3 DLC, who claims to be the "President of the World" and seeks to unite all of its people, using social media to spread his message and streaming video of his battles with strong fighters. During battle, he can perform a "G Charge" to increase his presidentiality level, enhancing his special moves. He can also create a momentary shield to protect him from single-hit projectile attacks.

Kage

Kage (影ナル者 Kagenaru Mono, lit. "The Shadowed One") is a physical manifestation of the Satsui no Hadō separated from Ryu's body, introduced in Street Fighter V Season 4 DLC. The Satsui no Hadō is purged from Ryu's body during the events of Street Fighter V: A Shadow Falls, but somehow develops sentience and manifests as an independent physical entity calling itself Kagenaru Mono. As a sentient version of Evil Ryu, Kage's fighting style is reminiscent of pre-sentient counterpart from the earlier games, including Akuma's Oni form from Street Fighter IV updates. His own character story ends with him fading away from existence after Ryu overwhelms him by tapping to the Power of Nothingness.

Kolin

Portrayed by: Amy Olivia Bell
 is a character who made her playable debut in Street Fighter V Season 2 DLC. She first appears in Street Fighter III in a non-playable capacity as Gill's assistant. She is featured prominently in Street Fighter V: A Shadow Falls, operating under the name "Helen" and organizing a group of fighters to help stop Bison's plan in order to advance the Illuminati's goals. She later joins the playable roster during the game's second season of DLC content. Her ice attacks that drain the opponent's stun meter will end up freezing them, rather than simply leaving them dizzy. The fighting style she uses is Systema, a hybrid Russian martial arts that can be seen in her use of counters, throws and strikes.

Laura

Lucia

 is a character who makes her playable debut in Street Fighter V Season 4 DLC. She was first introduced in 1995's Final Fight 3 as a detective with Metro City's Special Crimes Unit and one of the game's player characters. There, she worked with Guy and Haggar to take down the Skull Cross gang as thanks for Haggar clearing her of a false corruption charge in the past. In Street Fighter V, she continues to work with the Metro City Police Department under Mayor Cody, but is contacted by Haggar and asked to investigate a Mad Gear plot.

Luke

 is a character introduced in Street Fighter V Season 5 DLC as the final character of the game. He is an American MMA fighter who joined the military to become stronger after his father, Robert, was killed in a terrorist attack during his childhood. However, he finds his military training is not bringing him the type of strength he seeks. Guile suggests he find his own path instead, leading Luke to leave the army and become a competitive fighter to honor his father's memory.

He is described by director Takayuki Nakayama as an important character to the future of the Street Fighter franchise who was created to help expand the universe in the series takes place. On February 20, 2022 (February 21 in Japan) when Street Fighter 6 was announced, he appeared as one of the two first characters shown in the 40-second teaser trailer, the other being Ryu. In Street Fighter 6, Luke becomes a contractor for a PMC where he teaches his military MMA, following an incident conspired by a certain terrorist group who framed Ken.

Menat

 is a character introduced in Street Fighter V Season 2 DLC. She is the youthful, Egyptian apprentice of Rose, and like her is able to wield Soul Power and foresee future events. She can summon multiple orbs that can be shot away or retrieved. Her name may be a reference to the menat, an artifact linked to the cult of the Egyptian goddess Hathor. She also serves as the shopkeeper for the game's loot box system. 

Based on Japanese only Street Fighter V: Arcade Edition - Visionary Book II, a crystal ball she owned, the "Left Eye of the Lion" was stated by the current director Takayuki Nakayama to be created from a product of a god-beast believed to have once protected the phantom desert kingdom of Sangypt, a home territory of Red Earth villain Ravange. This suspects that Red Earth may or may likely take place in a feudal timeline of Street Fighter shared universe.

Necalli

 is a character introduced in Street Fighter V. Necalli is an ancient Aztec spiritual entity who descends from time to time to challenge the strongest living fighters and devour their souls after defeating them. Necalli is the only character in Street Fighter V who does not have a skeleton when electrocuted. In A Shadow Falls, he appears as an antagonist on his own, unrelated to Shadaloo nor the Secret Society. He is apparently permanently destroyed by Akuma in the latter's character story. His model was created by David Giraud of Volta, based in Montreal.

Rashid

 is a character introduced as the protagonist of Street Fighter V, according to Capcom, and is the eldest son of an old Middle Eastern family. Accompanied by his attendant Azam, He is searching for a missing female friend, who used to work as a S.I.N. Engineer before being kidnapped by Bison and Shadaloo. During a final battle against Shadaloo, he found out that his friend sacrifices her life to countermeasure Shadaloo's plan before F.A.N.G. killed her. Rashid has an obsession with the newest technology and is capable of producing small tornadoes, earning him the nickname "Rashid of the Turbulent Wind". The creation of Rashid was a close collaboration between Capcom Japan, Sony, and Pluto Games. Rashid's appearance was announced by Yoshinori Ono during the Games15 event in Dubai. Rashid's model was created by NXA Studios, based in China.

Zeku

 is a character is a character who makes his playable debut in Street Fighter V Season 2 DLC. He first appears as a non-playable character in Street Fighter Alpha 2 as Guy's teacher and the 38th Master of the Bushinryu school. After Guy defeats him, he passes on his title as Master and disappears. In Street Fighter V, he re-emerges to establish his own ninja clan and develop a new fighting style. During gameplay, he can vanish and reappear as a younger version of himself, which bears a strong resemblance to another Capcom character, Strider Hiryu. Ironically, Strider is one of Zeku's planned clan names, during a conversation between both of his older and younger-selves, therefore possibly connecting the Strider series to the Street Fighter shared universe. Streamline Studios, based in Malaysia, was responsible for modeling and rigging of his model.

Introduced in Street Fighter 6
Jamie

 was revealed in the Summer State of Play trailer on June 2, 2022. He is a drunken kung fu break dancer who is a rival of Luke, and idolizes the Lee brothers, Yun and Yang. The drink jug he uses in battle boosts his fighting skill, but contains , a kind of medicinal drink similar to tea, instead of alcohol.

JP

JP is a Russian Bartitsu fighter, head of an international investment NGO, and the main antagonist of Street Fighter 6, having been responsible for the Nayshall incident surrounding Luke and Ken’s lives. Aside from having a pet cat named Cybele, he is revealed to have a secret connection to the deceased primary antagonist of the series, M. Bison, due to him also having Psycho power and claims to be the late Shadaloo dictator’s successor.

Kimberly

 was also first shown in the trailer for June 2022 before being announced at EVO 2022. She is an African-American graduate student and graffiti artist. She recently became Guy's kunoichi apprentice and loves 1980's pop culture. Kimberly is also a natural born fighter who easily defeated Zeku, which led Guy to accept her request to be his apprentice.

Lily

Manon

 is an idealistic French ballerina, judoka champion, and celebrity who joined the competitive world fighting circuits to pursue true beauty through self-improvement.

Marisa

 is a giant muscular Italian jewelry designer and an MMA-Pankration fighter, whose medium-length red hair almost looks like a helmet. Inspired by Greco-Roman gladiator culture, she enters competitive fighting to seek both glorious beauty and strength. She was briefly seen in the first full trailer of Summer State Play 2022 before being fully revealed in Tokyo Game Show 2022.

Introduced in the Street Fighter EX series
The Street Fighter EX series is developed by Arika, a company formed of former Capcom employees. Arika later developed its own fighting game featuring characters from the series, Fighting EX Layer, which was released in 2018.

Ace

, who is introduced in Street Fighter EX3, is a government agent who is ordered by the prime minister of his nation to find information about a secret weapon being developed in an underground base. Ace uses a custom fighting style, which the player can edit by passing a series of trials in the game's Character Edit mode.

Allen

, who appears as a secret character in the original Street Fighter EX and as a regular character in Street Fighter EX Plus and EX Plus α, is a fighter who was said to be the strongest freestyle karate fighter on the American karate circuit, until he experienced his first defeat against a young Ken Masters at the All-American Martial Arts Tournament. Ken told Allen that he was only a "big fish in a small pond". Motivated by these words, Allen sets out to prove that he can be the best not only in America, but in the world. Although absent in Street Fighter EX2 and subsequent games, he makes an appearance in the Arika-developed arcade game Fighting Layer, where he seeks to defeat the strongest opponent on South Island. Allen returns in Fighting EX Layer, determined to defeat the recently revived Garuda to prove himself.

Area

, who first appears in Street Fighter EX2 Plus, is a young girl hailing from the United Kingdom with braided hair and glasses. She is the daughter of a scientific inventor, and her intellect is said to surpass his. When her father's inventions fail to sell, she modifies them as weapons and tests them in combat against the world's greatest martial artists. In battle, she wears a pair of high-speed rollerblades and a mechanical right arm codenamed . In Fighting EX Layer, disappointed by her inventions' lack of fame, she seeks out fellow inventor Balba Purna, coming into contact with his daughter Pullum along the way.

Bison II and Shin-Bison

Blair

, appears as a secret character in the original Street Fighter EX and as a regular character in Street Fighter EX Plus, EX Plus α, and Fighting EX Layer. She is the daughter of a wealthy European family. She fights wearing a light blue leotard and long boots. In addition to receiving a formal education, Blair has trained herself in various combat sports, believing that one day she will need to know how to defend her loved ones as well as herself. She travels the world to hone her skills with her bodyguard Cracker Jack, whom her mother has hired to protect her. Blair is acquainted with Pullum, as they are both members of the International Debutante Club. Her butler is called Sebastian. Like Allen, Blair appears in Arika's arcade fighting game Fighting Layer, in which she takes a sudden trip to South Island. She is also mentioned in Jack's ending in Street Fighter EX3.

Blair is ranked 53rd in a worldwide Street Fighter character poll held between 2017 and 2018.

C. Jack

, also known as C. Jack or just Jack, is a bat-wielding former bouncer from Las Vegas, known for his unstoppable punches. While being pursued by an unknown organization, he becomes Blair's bodyguard to travel the world and flee his pursuers. In Street Fighter EX2, his younger sister is kidnapped by an underground fighting champion named Bharat. In Street Fighter EX2 Plus, he continues to be pursued by the mysterious organization, and by the end of Street Fighter EX3 he seeks refuge in Blair's mansion. In Fighting EX Layer, Jack escapes the organization by leaving Blair's employ and fleeing to America.

Cycloid-β and Cycloid-γ
Beta primarily uses command-based special moves, while Gamma specializes in charge-based moves. Both characters were based on test models used for motion capture during the development of the game. Beta is an untextured blue polygonal model resembling a male human, and Gamma is a green wireframed model. In the Japanese version of Street Fighter EX Plus α for the PlayStation, Gamma is given an additional back-story, a weapon secretly developed by Pullum's father Balba to annihilate a huge criminal organization. In Street Fighter EX2 Plus, an unidentified Cycloid model appears in one of the bonus rounds.

D. Dark

His back-story for Street Fighter EX2 establishes that he was raised in a mercenary training facility, where he was trained in the use of weapons similar to Rolento's, such as knives, grenades, and wires. Dark once served in the American armed forces. He was in a special forces unit led by Guile when it became involved in a scuffle against a rival unit led by Rolento. Holger was the sole survivor of his unit, but suffered tremendous physical and mental scars. He seeks revenge against Guile, feeling that he did not train him sufficiently. During the development of Street Fighter EX, the developers nicknamed him . In July 2011, a video from an Arika 3DS test project, called Fighting Sample, was released featuring Dark. In Fighting EX Layer, Dark appears as a villainous character influenced by Garuda's negative energy.

Doctrine Dark was among the 20 fighters GamesRadar wished were included in Street Fighter X Tekken.

Darun

, makes his appearance as a hidden character in the original Street Fighter EX. He is a popular wrestling champion from India who seeks to challenge other wrestlers such as Zangief and Victor Ortega (from the Saturday Night Slam Masters series). He agrees to become Pullum Purna's bodyguard, hoping to use the opportunity to travel the world and fight many wrestlers. He is absent from the original Street Fighter EX2, but returns in Street Fighter EX2 Plus, in which he obtains another opportunity to fight against more wrestlers around the world after Pullum becomes a princess. In Street Fighter EX3, he has a special ending if the player finishes the single-player mode with Zangief as his tag-partner. Darun returns in Fighting EX Layer.

Garuda

 first appears as a non-playable boss character in the original Street Fighter EX, but becomes a playable character in subsequent installments. He is a demon dressed in samurai-like armor who wields a sword hidden within his own body. According to his back-story in the original Street Fighter EX, he was created by the souls of dead men who were consumed by the Satsui no Hadō, although his revised back-story in Street Fighter EX2 suggests that he has an accumulation of negative feelings such as anger, hatred, envy, treachery, and despair. Garuda's form is said to change depending on his opponent: he takes a strong form against warriors seeking strength and feeds on the hatred of warriors who are seeking vengeance. Garuda returns as the antagonist of Fighting EX Layer.

Hayate

He is following the footsteps of his father, a legendary hero who once saved his home village from the demon , and is one of the few Street Fighter characters to use a sword in combat. At the end of the original EX2, he vanquishes the demon his father once sealed and saves the local shrine maiden, becoming the new guardian deity of Kukunoichi. Hayate is the only character from the original EX2 who was absent in the arcade version of Street Fighter EX2 Plus. He was re-included in the PlayStation version of the game as a hidden character. A new Hayate, the descendant of the original, appears as a playable character in Fighting EX Layer.

Hokuto and Bloody Hokuto

 is the daughter of the  family, who was trained in the family's style of kobujutsu, which has been refined into her personal style that resembles the art of aikijujutsu. When Hokuto turned 17, she was sent on a journey to find her older half-brother Kairi, who went missing years before. Unknown to Hokuto, the true purpose of her journey was not only to find her brother, but to defeat him. In the original Street Fighter EX, Hokuto wears a blue-white outfit resembling that of a Japanese archer, and white hachimaki around her long hair. In EX2, she wears a hakama and ties her hair in a pony-tail. She reverts to her original design in EX3. In addition to her regular version, an alternate version named  is featured as secret character in Street Fighter EX Plus. Bloody Hokuto returns in Fighting EX Layer, now going by her original name of Shirase.

Kairi

, who first appears as a secret character in the original Street Fighter EX, is depicted as an amnesiac who was initially conceived to be the main character in the EX series. Kairi was born to the main house of the Mizukami family and was trained in the family's traditional art of karate. He appears in the original EX and its re-releases with long black hair and a scar over his left eye. He lost his memories while fighting an unknown challenger and now walks the "Path of the Shura", fighting to survive. He learns that he is the elder brother of Hokuto, who has been on a mission to find him. In EX2, his hair has changed from black to white as a result of his constant battles. After confronting Hokuto and Nanase, he recovers his memories and learns that he was responsible for the death of their father. Kairi returns as the protagonist of Fighting EX Layer.

Nanase

, who first appears as a hidden character in the original Street Fighter EX2 and becomes a regular character in Street Fighter EX2 Plus and Street Fighter EX3, is the younger sister of Hokuto. She was raised to be a successor to the Mizugami clan. Nanase is a skilled master of bojutsu. Nanase becomes worried about Hokuto after she leaves the shrine where they live and does not return. She then learns from her grandfather that she has a brother named Kairi, whom Hokuto was sent to find. She goes on a journey to find Hokuto and Kairi, unaware that the journey is also a test to determine whether she is fit to inherit the Mizugami teachings. Ultimately, she is freed from the Mizugami clan by Hokuto and her memories of her past sealed, allowing her to live a normal life.

Pullum

 is the daughter of Balba Purna, an Arab multimillionaire and inventor. She decides to travel the world with her bodyguard Darun when she overhears her grandfather whisper the name "Shadaloo", believing that it is the name of a person. Unknown to Pullum, the reason why her grandfather is worried about Shadaloo is that she has a blood relative working for the organization who is a candidate to become a Shadaloo executive. She is absent from the original Street Fighter EX2 but returns in Street Fighter EX2 Plus, in which she inherits a kingdom after the death of a relative and decides to travel the world once again with Darun to search for her missing father. Pullum's theme tune was later used in the game Technictix. Pullum returns as a downloadable character in Fighting EX Layer.

Shadowgeist

 first appears as a secret character in the arcade version of the original Street Fighter EX2 as well as in Street Fighter EX2 Plus and Street Fighter EX3. He is an unknown man from an unnamed country, dressed in a lethal superhero costume similar to Skullomania's. He has artificially enhanced his body in order to overthrow the men in charge of the totalitarian government responsible for the deaths of his wife and daughter. Shadowgeist appears again in Fighting EX Layer, with most of his moves renamed from the ruthless vigilante motifs into the Greek alphabetic-based reformed agent motifs.

Sharon

, who debuts in Street Fighter EX2, is a beautiful red-haired woman with a tattoo of a rose on her chest. Sharon is depicted wielding a gun in the character artwork for the original EX2, but she does not use any firearms until EX2 Plus. In the story, she lives a double life as a nun taking care of orphans at a monastery and an A-class agent for a secret intelligence group. Having separated from her parents when she was young, her only desire is to be reunited with her family and learn about her past. When she learns that a key member of a criminal organization she was assigned to investigate has the same tattoo that she has, she goes after him to find out why. Her exact nationality is never given. Sharon later returned as a downloadable character in Fighting EX Layer.

Skullomania

He adopts his superhero identity when a client asks him to dress up and pose for a superhero attraction at his department store. Donning a full-body skeleton suit, Skullomania sets out to fight evil for real. In Street Fighter EX2, his costume is redesigned, adding a red scarf and a red letter "S" in front of his mask, along with white gloves and boots and a belt. Skullomania reappears in Fighting EX Layer, having settled back into life as a salaryman but finding himself unexpectedly transforming into his superhero persona without any memory of doing so afterward. With new powers also developing as well, he sets out to find the reason behind these sudden changes.

Many elements of Skullomania are homages to the Showa era tokusatsu genre of Japanese action shows in general and Kamen Rider in particular, specifically the red scarf and belt since Street Fighter EX2, and prominence of flying kicks in his fighting style. He makes later appearances in the PlayStation 2 music game Technictix and in Fighter Maker. As a nod to Skullomania, Capcom gave El Fuerte a similar skull costume in the Halloween pack for Street Fighter IV. A female version of Skullomania appears as a special guest character in SNK Heroines: Tag Team Frenzy.

Among the cast of characters introduced in the Street Fighter EX series, Skullomania is the most popular. He is ranked 16th in a worldwide Street Fighter character poll held between 2017 and 2018.

V. Rosso

, who makes his debut in Street Fighter EX2 Plus, is a mysterious Italian warrior who leaves his organization in order to avenge the death of his lover. He comes from Bari, and his special moves are named after locations in Italy such as Aetna, Vesuvio, Canossa, Ponte dei Sospiri (Bridge of Sighs), and Torre Pendente (Leaning Tower). At the end of EX3, he returns home after getting his revenge on his lover's murderer. Rosso appears as a downloadable fighter in Fighting EX Layer.

Introduced in Street Fighter: The Movie (arcade game)
Below are characters that made their debut in the arcade game based on the live action film.

Blade
, played by game designer Alan Noon, is a character who appears exclusively in the Street Fighter: The Movie arcade game. A red-clad member of Bison's shock troops from the film on which the game is based upon, he has undergone rigorous physical training and conceals an array of weapons such as knives and grenades. As revealed in his ending sequence, he is actually Guile's brother Gunloc (Lucky Colt (ラッキー・コルト Rakkī Koruto) in the Japanese version) who has infiltrated the Shadaloo Gang as a deep cover agent, reporting to his brother. As Gunloc, he features in the 1993 wrestling game Saturday Night Slam Masters and its 1994 sequel Ring of Destruction: Slam Masters II, as a hot-headed street fighter turned professional wrestler. After having fulfilled his purpose at Shadaloo, he is said to have returned to professional wrestling. With the release of Street Fighter V, he was given an official entry in the game's encyclopedia and thus was canonized. His stats are exactly the same as listed in the original Slam Masters video game, again confirming his true identity.

Arkane, Khyber and F7
There are three other hidden characters in the arcade game, who are all palette swaps of Blade.  (the yellow shock trooper) uses special techniques that resemble the ones used by Dhalsim (who was not featured in the arcade game) such as the Yoga Flame and Yoga Blast.  (the blue shock trooper) can teleport.  (the black shock trooper) has all the techniques of the other three shock troopers. They all share Blade's ending. The four shock troopers are the only characters from the arcade game excluded from the Street Fighter: The Movie console game, which is a different game based on the same film.

Sawada
Portrayed by: Kenya Sawada
 is an original character from the 1994 Street Fighter film, who appears as a playable character in both the arcade and the console version of the Street Fighter: The Movie video game. Sawada's voice is the only one dubbed in the film, as Sawada himself only speaks a little English.

Michael Dobson voiced Sawada in two episodes of the Street Fighter television series, as head of the A.N. Special Forces when Guile was discharged and formed his team.

Introduced in Street Fighter II MOVIE
This character was only playable in the Street Fighter II MOVIE.

Cyborg
, mainly known as Cyborg, is a character created for the Street Fighter II: The Animated Movie. It is a playable character at the end of the homonymous game released for the PlayStation and later Sega Saturn, exclusive to the NTSC region (also known as Street Fighter II: The Interactive Game).

Cyborg was a new model of Monitor Cyborg secretly developed by Shadaloo. Its objective was to develop its abilities by analyzing the fighting techniques of martial artists around the world in order to gain enough strength to challenge Ryu in combat. While the majority of Cyborg's mission is watching Street Fighters battle, the Cyborg faces Ryu near the game's end. The Cyborg's special moves are the same ones used by Ken in Super Street Fighter II Turbo, including his Shōryū Reppa Super Combo.

Introduced in Street Fighter Online: Mouse Generation
This character was only playable in the Street Fighter Online: Mouse Generation.

Shin
 is a playable character in Street Fighter Online: Mouse Generation'' making his debut during the game's 18 December 2008 update. He is the only new character created for the game. He is the son of a Japanese karate master and the grandson of a Korean taekwondo master on his mother's side. Pressured by his parents into upholding the family legacy, Shin was not interested in doing so. Eventually, he changes his opinion of martial arts and takes up taekwondo because he thought the style was brilliant and cool.

References

Further reading

Street Fighter characters
 
Lists of video game characters